Chuvash is a Turkic language spoken in European Russia, primarily in the Chuvash Republic and adjacent areas. It is the only surviving member of the Oghur branch of Turkic languages, one of the two principal branches of the Turkic family. 

The writing system for the Chuvash language is based on the Cyrillic script, employing all of the letters used in the Russian alphabet and adding four letters of its own: Ӑ, Ӗ, Ҫ and Ӳ.

Usage

Chuvash is the native language of the Chuvash people and an official language of Chuvashia. It is spoken by 1,640,000 persons in Russia and another 34,000 in other countries. 86% of ethnic Chuvash and 8% of the people of other ethnicities living in Chuvashia claimed knowledge of Chuvash language during the 2002 census. Despite that and although Chuvash is taught at schools and sometimes used in the media, it is considered endangered, because Russian dominates in most spheres of life and few children learning the language are likely to become active users.

A fairly significant production and publication of literature in Chuvash still continues. According to UNESCO's Index Translationum, at least 202 books translated from Chuvash were published in other languages (mostly Russian) since ca. 1979. However, as with most other languages of the former USSR, most of the translation activity took place before the dissolution of the USSR: out of the 202 translations, 170 books were published in the USSR and just 17, in the post-1991 Russia (mostly, in the 1990s). A similar situation takes place with the translation of books from other languages (mostly Russian) into Chuvash (the total of 175 titles published since ca. 1979, but just 18 of them in post-1991 Russia).

History
Chuvash is the most distinctive of the Turkic languages and cannot be understood by other Turkic speakers, whose languages have varying degrees of mutual intelligibility within their respective subgroups. Chuvash is classified, alongside several extinct languages including Bulgar, as the only remaining member of the Oghuric branch of the Turkic language family. Since the surviving literary records for the non-Chuvash members of Oghuric are scant, the exact position of Chuvash within the Oghuric family cannot be determined.

The Oghuric branch is distinguished from the rest of the Turkic family (the Common Turkic languages) by two sound changes: r corresponding to Common Turkic z and l corresponding to Common Turkic š. The first scientific fieldwork description of Chuvash, by August Ahlqvist in 1856, allowed researchers to establish its proper affiliation.

Chuvash language is a highly divergent form of Turkic, and is not easily recognized as such. Some scholars suggest Hunnic had strong ties with Chuvash and classify Chuvash as Hunno-Bulgar. Chuvash is so divergent from the main body of Turkic languages that some scholars formerly considered Chuvash to be a Turkified Finno-Ugric (Uralic) language. Conversely, other scholars regard it as a Turkic language heavily influenced by Finno-Ugric languages.

The following sound changes and resulting sound correspondences are typical:

Most of the (non-allophonic) consonant changes listed in the table above are thought to date from the period before the Bulgars migrated to the Volga region in the 10th century; some notable exceptions are the č > ś shift and the final stage of the -d > -ð > -z > -r shift, which date from the following, Volga Bulgar period (between the 10th-century migration and the Mongol invasions of the 13th century). The vowel changes mostly occurred later, mainly during the Middle Chuvash period (between the invasions and the 17th century), except for the diphthongisation, which took place during the Volga Bulgar period. Many sound changes known from Chuvash can be observed in Turkic loanwords into Hungarian (from the pre-migration period) and in Volga Bulgar epitaphs or loanwords into languages of the Volga region (from the Volga Bulgar period). Nevertheless, these sources also indicate that there was significant dialectal variation within the Oguric-speaking population during both of these periods.

Comparison with Turkic languages 
In the VIII—X centuries in Central Asia, the ancient Turkic script (the Orkhon-Yenisei runic script) was used for writing in Turkic languages. Turkic epitaphs of VII-IX AD were left by speakers of various dialects (table):

 Often in the Chuvash language, the Turkic sounds -j- (oguz), -d- (uighur), -z- (kipchak) are replaced by -r- (oghur), example rotacism:

Words in the Turkic languages: leg, put-

j - language (Oguz): ajaq, qoj-

d - language (Uyghur): adaq, qod-

z - language (Kypchak): azaq, qoz-

r - language (Oghur): urah, hor-  

 Often in the Chuvash language, the Turkic sound -q- is replaced by -h-, example hitaism :

Words in Turkic languages: black, goose, girl, zucchini

Oguz, kipchaks: qara, qaz, qyz, qabaq

Chuvash: hura, hur, hĕr, hupah 

The -h- sound disappears if it is the last letter .

Dudaq - Tuta - Lips instead of Tutah

Ayaq - Ura - Leg instead of Urah

Baliq - Pulă - Fish instead of Pulăh

Ineq - Ĕne - Cow  instead of Ĕneh  

 Turkic sound -j-  (oguz) and -ž- (kipchaks)  is replaced by chuvash -ş-, example:

Words in Turkic languages: egg, snake, rain, house, earth

Oguz: jumurta, jylan, jagmur, jort, jez (turk., azerb., tat.,)

Kipchaks: žumurtka, žylan, žamgyr, žort, žer (kyrgyz., kazakh.)

Chuvash: şămarta, şĕlen, şămăr, şurt, şĕr 

 The Turkic sound -š- is replaced by the Chuvash -L-, example lambdaism:

Words in Turkic languages: winter, silver, sun

Oguz, Kipchaks: qyš, qemeš, qoyaš

Chuvash: hĕl, qӗmӗl, hĕvel 

 In the field of vowels, we observe the following correspondences: the common Turkic -a- in the first syllable of the word in Chuvash correspond to -u-.

Words in Turkic languages: horse, coin, head, step

Oguz, Kipchaks: at, akça, baš, adym

Chuvash: ut, ukşa, puş, utăm 

In modern times, in Chuvash [a] remains, Tatar "kapka" ~ Chuvash "hapha" (gate), when there should be a "hupha" from the root "hup - close".

 In the field of vowels, G. F. Miller observes another example when -u- is replaced by -wu- or -wă-

Words in Turkic languages: fire, ten, forest, russian, he, thirty

Oguz: ut, un, urman, urus, ul, utyz

Chuvash (upper): wut, wun, wărman, wyrăs, wăl, wătăr

Kipchaks: оt, оn, оrman, orus, ol, оtyz

Chuvash (lower): wot, won, wărman, wyrăs, wăl, wătăr 

The fricative -g- in some words in Chuvash corresponds to -v-

Words in Turkic languages: native, mountain

Oguz: tugan, dag

Chuvash: tăvan, tuv

Dialects
There are two dialects of Chuvash:
 Viryal or Upper (which has both o and u) and
 Anatri or Lower (which has u for both o and u: up. totă, "full", tută "taste" – lo. tută, "full, taste").
The literary language is based on both the Lower and Upper dialects. Both Tatar and the neighbouring Uralic languages such as Mari have influenced the Chuvash language, as have Russian, Mongolian, Arabic and Persian, which have all added many words to the Chuvash lexicon.

Writing systems

Official
Letters in bold are solely used in loanwords.

Fanmade Latin alphabet 
Fanmade Latin alphabet used by Chuvash people living in the USA and Europe, used for the convenience of writing Chuvash words

Examples of writing text: 

Çĕkĕntĕr (Чĕкĕнтĕр) - beet, Çul (Чул) - stone, Çüreçe (Чӳрече) - window

Śĕmĕrt (Ҫĕмĕрт) - bird cherry, Śăkăr (Ҫăкăр) - bread

Şură (Шурă) - white, Şăl (Шăл) - tooth, Şapa (Шапа) - frog

Üpĕte (Ӳпĕте) - monkey, Ükerçĕk (Ӳкерчĕк) - drawing

Jiraf (Жираф) - giraffe, Juk (Жук) - beatle, Jyuri (Жюри) - jury

Energi (Энерги) - energy, Etem (Этем) - human, Epĕr (Эпĕр) - we

Yuman (Юман) - oak, Yur (Юр) - snow

Yalav (Ялав) - flag, Yapala (Япала) - thing

Jomkăś (Ёмкăҫ) - container, Jorşik (ёршик) - brush

Wăylă (Вăйлă) - strong, Wiśśĕ (Виҫҫĕ) - three

Transliteration of the Chuvash alphabet

1873–1938

The modern Chuvash alphabet was devised in 1873 by school inspector Ivan Yakovlevich Yakovlev.

In 1938, the alphabet underwent significant modification which brought it to its current form.

Previous systems
The most ancient writing system, known as the Old Turkic alphabet, disappeared after the Volga Bulgars converted to Islam. Later, the Arabic script was adopted. After the Mongol invasion, writing degraded. After Peter the Great's reforms Chuvash elites disappeared, blacksmiths and some other crafts were prohibited for non-Russian nations, the Chuvash were educated in Russian, while writing in runes recurred with simple folk.

Phonology

Consonants
The consonants are the following (the corresponding Cyrillic letters are in brackets): The stops, sibilants and affricates are voiceless and fortes but become lenes (sounding similar to voiced) in intervocalic position and after liquids, nasals and semi-vowels. Аннепе sounds like annebe, but кушакпа sounds like kuzhakpa. However, geminate consonants do not undergo this lenition. Furthermore, the voiced consonants occurring in Russian are used in modern Russian-language loans. Consonants also become palatalized before and after front vowels.

Vowels

According to Krueger (1961), the Chuvash vowel system is as follows (the precise IPA symbols are chosen based on his description since he uses a different transcription).

András Róna-Tas (1997) provides a somewhat different description, also with a partly idiosyncratic transcription. The following table is based on his version, with additional information from Petrov (2001). Again, the IPA symbols are not directly taken from the works so they could be inaccurate.

The vowels ӑ and ӗ are described as reduced, thereby differing in quantity from the rest. In unstressed positions, they often resemble a schwa or tend to be dropped altogether in fast speech.

Additionally,  (о) occurs in loanwords from Russian where the syllable is stressed in Russian.

Word accent
The usual rule given in grammars of Chuvash is that the last full (non-reduced) vowel of the word is stressed; if there are no full vowels, the first vowel is stressed. Reduced vowels that precede or follow a stressed full vowel are extremely short and non-prominent. One scholar, Dobrovolsky, however, hypothesises that there is in fact no stress in disyllabic words in which both vowels are reduced.

Morphonology

Vowel harmony 
Vowel harmony is the principle by which a native Chuvash word generally incorporates either exclusively back or hard vowels (а, ӑ, у, ы) and exclusively front or soft vowels (е, ӗ, ӳ, и). As such, a Chuvash suffix such as -тен means either -тан or -тен, whichever promotes vowel harmony; a notation such as -тпӗр means either -тпӑр, -тпӗр, again with vowel harmony constituting the deciding factor.

Chuvash has two classes of vowels: front and back (see the table above). Vowel harmony states that words may not contain both front and back vowels. Therefore, most grammatical suffixes come in front and back forms, e.g. Шупашкарта, "in Cheboksary" but килте, "at home".

Two vowels cannot occur in succession.

Exceptions 

Vowel harmony does not apply for some invariant suffixes such as the plural ending -сем and the 3rd person (possessive or verbal) ending -ӗ, which only have a front version. It also does not occur in loanwords and in a few native Chuvash words (such as анне "mother"). In such words suffixes harmonize with the final vowel; thus Аннепе "with the mother".

Compound words are considered separate words with respect to vowel harmony: vowels do not have to harmonize between members of the compound (so forms like сӗтел|пукан "furniture" are permissible).

Other processes 
The consonant т often alternates with ч before ӗ from original *i (ят 'name' - ячӗ 'his name'). There is also an alternation between т (after consonants) and р (after vowels): тетел 'fishing net (nom.)' - dative тетел-те, but пулӑ 'fish (nom.)' - dative пулӑ-ра.

Consonants

Voiceless consonant sounds, if they stand in the middle and end of words become voiced:

Words in english - sword, owner, peak, lunch, bouillon, window, glass, little, slice

Written  - hĕşĕ, huşa, pekĕ, apat, šürpe, çüreçе, kĕlençe, pĕçĕkke, katăk

Pronounced - hĕžĕ, huža, pegĕ, abat, šürbe, çürejе, kĕlenje, pĕjĕkke, kadăk

Geminated voiceless consonants are not voiced:

ikkĕ - two, piççe - brother, sakkăr - eight, appa - sister.

Grammar
As characteristic of all Turkic languages, Chuvash is an agglutinative language and as such, has an abundance of suffixes but no native prefixes or prepositions, apart from the partly reduplicative intensive prefix, such as in:  - white,  - snow-white,  - black,  - jet black,  - flat,  - absolutely flat,  - full,  - chock full (compare to Turkish  - white,  snow-white,  - black,  - jet black,  - flat,  - absolutely flat,  - full,  - chock full). One word can have many suffixes, which can also be used to create new words like creating a verb from a noun or a noun from a verbal root. See Vocabulary below. It can also indicate the grammatical function of the word.

Nominals

Nouns
Chuvash nouns decline in number and case and also take suffixes indicating the person of a possessor. The suffixes are placed in the order possession - number - case. There are six noun cases in the Chuvash declension system:

In the suffixes where the first consonant varies between р- and т-, the allomorphs beginning in т- are used after stems ending in the dental sonorants -р, -л and -н. The allomorphs beginning in р- occur under all other circumstances. The dative-accusative allomorph beginning in н- is mostly used after stems ending in vowels, except in -и, -у, and -ӑ/-ӗ, whereas the one consisting only of a vowel is used after stems ending in consonants.

The nominative is used instead of the dative-accusative to express indefinite or general objects, e.g. утӑ типӗт 'to dry hay'. It can also be used instead of the genitive to express a possessor, so that the combination gets a generalised compound-like meaning (лаша пӳҫӗ 'a horse head' vs лашан пӳҫӗ 'the horse's head'); with both nominative and genitive, however, the possessed noun has a possessive suffix (see below). 

In the genitive and dative-accusative cases, some nouns ending in -у and -ӳ were changed to -ӑв and -ӗв (ҫыру → ҫырӑван, ҫырӑва, but ҫырура; пӳ → пӗвен, пӗве, but пӳре). In nouns ending in -ӑ, the last vowel simply deletes and may cause the last consonant to geminate (пулӑ 'fish' > пуллан). Nouns ending in consonants sometimes also geminate the last letter (ҫын 'man' → ҫыннан).

There are also some rarer cases, such as:
 Terminative–antessive (to), formed by adding -(ч)чен
 relic of distributive, formed by adding -серен: кунсерен "daily, every day", килсерен "per house", килмессерен "every time one comes"
 Semblative (as), formed by adding пек to pronouns in genitive or objective case (ман пек, "like me", сан пек, "like you", ун пек, "like him, that way", пирӗн пек, "like us", сирӗн пек, "like you all", хам пек, "like myself", хӑвӑн пек, "like yourself", кун пек, "like this"); adding -ла, -ле to nouns (этемле, "humanlike", ленинла, "like Lenin")
 Postfix: ха (ha); adding -шкал, -шкел to nouns in the dative (actually a postposition, but the result is spelt as one word: унашкал 'like that').

Taking кун (day) as an example:

Possession is expressed by means of constructions based on verbs meaning "to exist" and "not to exist" ("пур" and "ҫук"). For example, to say, "The cat had no shoes":

 
 

which literally translates as "cat-of foot-cover(of)-plural-his non-existent-was."

The possessive suffixes are as follows (ignoring vowel harmony):

Stem-final vowels are deleted when the vowel-initial suffixes (-у, -и, -ӑр) are added to them. The 3rd person allomorph -ӗ is added to stems ending in consonants, whereas -и is used with stems ending in vowels. There is also another postvocalic variant -шӗ, which is used only in designations of family relationships: аппа 'elder sister' > аппа-шӗ. Furthermore, the noun атте 'father' is irregularly declined in possessive forms:

When case endings are added to the possessive suffixes, some changes may occur: the vowels comprising the 2nd and 3rd singular possessive suffixes are dropped before the dative-accusative suffix: (ывӑл-у-на 'to your son', ывӑл-ӗ-нe 'to his son' > ывӑлна, ывӑлнe), whereas a -н- is inserted between them and the locative and ablative suffixes: ывӑл-у-н-та 'in/at your son', ывӑл-ӗ-н-чен 'from his son'.

Adjectives
Adjectives do not agree with the nouns they modify, but may receive nominal case endings when standing alone, without a noun. The comparative suffix is -рах/-рех, or -тарах/терех after stems ending in -р or, optionally, other sonorant consonants. The superlative is formed by encliticising or procliticising the particles чи or чӑн to the adjective in the positive degree. A special past tense form meaning '(subject) was A' is formed by adding the suffix -(ч)чӗ. Another notable feature is the formation of intensive forms via complete or partial reduplication: кǎтра 'curly' - кǎп-кǎтра 'completely curly'.

The 'separating' form

Both nouns and adjectives, declined or not, may take special 'separating' forms in -и (causing gemination when added to reduced vowel stems and, in nouns, when added to consonant-final stems) and -скер. The meaning of the form in -и is, roughly, 'the one of them that is X', while the form in -скер may be rendered as '(while) being X'. For example, пӳлӗм-р(е)-и-сем 'those of them who are in the room'. The same suffixes may form the equivalent of dependent clauses: ачисем килте-скер-ӗн мӗн хуйхӑрмалли пур унӑн? 'If his children (are) at home, what does he have to be sad about?', йӗркеллӗ çынн-и курӑнать 'You (can) see that he is a decent person', эсӗ килт(e)-и савӑнтарать (lit. 'That you are at home, pleases one').

Pronouns 
The personal pronouns exhibit partly suppletive allomorphy between the nominative and oblique stems; case endings are added to the latter:

Demonstratives are ку 'this', çак 'this' (only for a known object), çав 'that' (for a somewhat remote object), леш 'that' (for a remote object), хай 'that' (the above-mentioned). There is a separate reflexive originally consisting of the stem in х- and personal possessive suffixes:

Interrogatives are кам 'who', мӗн 'what', хаш/хӑшӗ 'which'. Negative pronouns are formed by adding the prefix ни- to the interrogatives: никам, ним(ӗн), etc. Indefinite pronouns use the prefix та-: такам etc. Totality is expressed by пур 'all', пӗтӗм 'whole', харпӑр 'every'.

Among the pronominal adverbs that are not productively formed from the demonstratives, notable ones are the interrogatives хăçан 'when' and ăçта 'where'.

Verbs
Chuvash verbs exhibit person and can be made negative or impotential; they can also be made potential. Finally, Chuvash verbs exhibit various distinctions of tense, mood and aspect: a verb can be progressive, necessitative, aorist, future, inferential, present, past, conditional, imperative or optative.

The sequence of verbal suffixes is as follows: voice - iterativity - potentiality - negation - tense/gerund/participle - personal suffix.

Finite verb forms 
The personal endings of the verb are mostly as follows (abstracting from vowel harmony):

The 1st person allomorph containing -п- is found in the present and future tenses, the one containing -м- is found in other forms. The 3rd singular is absent in the future and in the present tenses, but causes palatalisation of the preceding consonant in the latter. The vowel-final allomorph of the 3rd plural -ҫӗ is used in the present. The imperative has somewhat more deviant endings in some of its forms:

To these imperative verb forms, one may add particles expressing insistence (-сам) or, conversely, softness (-ччӗ) and politeness (-ах).

The main tense markers are:

The consonant -т of the present tense marker assimilates to the 3rd plural personal ending: -ҫҫĕ. The past tense allomorph -р- is used after vowels, while -т- is used after consonants. The simple past tense is used only for witnesses events, whereas retold events are expressed using the past participle suffix -н(ӑ) (see below). In addition to the iterative past, there is also an aspectual iterative suffix -кала- expressing repetitive action.

There are also modal markers, which do not combine with tense markers and hence have sometimes been described as tenses of their own:

The concessive suffix -ин is added after the personal endings, but in the 2nd singular and plural, a -с- suffix is added before them: кур-ӑ-сӑн(-ин) 'alright, see it'. If the particle -ччӗ is added, the meaning becomes optative.

Potentiality is expressed with the suffix -(а)й 'be able to'.

The negative is expressed by a suffix inserted before the tense and modal markers. It contains -м- and mostly has the form -м(а)-, but -мас- in the present and -мӑ- in the future. The imperative uses the proclitic particle ан instead (or, optionally, an enclitic мар in the 1st person).

A change of valency to a passive-reflexive 'voice' may be effected by the addition of the suffixes -ӑл- and -ӑн-, but the process is not productive and the choice of suffix is not predictable. Still, if both occur with the same stem, -ӑл- is passive and -ӑн- is reflexive. A 'reciprocal voice' form is produced by the suffixes -ӑш and -ӑҫ. There are two causative suffixes - a non-productive -ат/ар/ӑт and a productive -(т)тар (the single consonant allomorph occurring after monosyllabic stems).

There are, furthermore, various periphrastic constructions using the non-finite verb forms, mostly featuring predicative use of the participles (see below).

Non-finite verb forms 
Some of the non-finite verb forms are:

I. Attributive participles

 Present participle: -акан (вӗренекен 'studying' or 'being studied'); the negative form is the same as that of the past participle (see below);
 Past participle: -н(ӑ) (курнӑ 'which has seen' or 'which has been seen'); the final vowel disappears in the negative (курман)
 Future participle: -ас (каяс 'who will go')
 Present participle expressing a permanent characteristic: -ан (вӗҫен 'flying')
 Present participle expressing pretence: -анҫи, -иш
 Necessitative participle: -малла (пулмалла 'who must become'); the negative is formed by adding the enclitic мар
 Satisfaction participle: -малӑх (вуламалӑх 'which is enough to be read')
 Potentiality participle: -и (ути 'which can go')

The suffix -и may be added to participles to form a verbal noun: ҫыр-нӑ ;'written' > ҫыр-н-и 'writing'.

II. Adverbial participles (converbs)

 -са (default: doing, having done, while about to do') (-сар after a negative suffix)
 -а 'doing Y' (the verb form is usually reduplicated)
 -нӑҫем(-ен) 'the more the subject does Y': 
 -уҫӑн 'while doing Y'
 -сан 'having done Y', 'if the subject does Y'
 -нӑранпа 'after/since having done Y'
 -массерен 'whenever the subject does Y'
 -иччен 'before/until doing Y'

III. Infinitives

The suffixes -ма and -машкӑн form infinitives.

There are many verbal periphrastic constructions using the non-finite forms, including:
 a habitual past using the present participle and expressing periodicity (эпĕ вулакан-ччĕ, lit. 'I was [a] reading [one]');
 an alternative pluperfect using the past participle (эпĕ чĕннĕ-ччĕ, lit. 'I [was] one that had called'; negated by using the negatively conjugated participle эпĕ чĕнмен-ччĕ);
 a general present equal to the present participle (эпĕ  ҫыракан, lit. 'I [am a] writing [one]'; negated with the enclitic мар), 
 an alternative future expressing certainty and equal to the future participle (эпĕ илес 'I [am] one who will get'; negated with an encliticised ҫук),
 a necessitative future using the necessitative participle (ман/эпĕ тарант(ар)малла 'I [am] one who must feed'; negated with мар), 
 a second desiderative future expressing a wish and using the converb in -сан (эпĕ ҫĕнтерсен-ччĕ, 'I wish I'd win'), 
 another desiderative form expressing a wish for the future and using the future participle followed by -чĕ (эпĕ пĕлес-чĕ 'I wish/hope I know', negated by мар with an encliticised -ччĕ).

Word order
Word order in Chuvash is generally subject–object–verb. Modifiers (adjectives and genitives) precede their heads in nominal phrases, too. The language uses postpositions, often originating from case-declined nouns, but the governed noun is usually in the nominative, e.g. тĕп çи-не 'onto (the surface of) the ground' (even though a governed pronoun tends to be in the genitive). Yes/no-questions are formed with an encliticised interrogative particle -и. The language often uses verb phrases that are formed by combining the adverbial participle in -са and certain common verbs such as пыр 'go', çӳре 'be going',  кай 'go (away from the speaker)', кил 'go (towards the speaker)', ил 'take', кала 'say', тăр 'stand', юл 'stay', яр 'let go'; e.g. кĕрсe кай 'go entering > enter', тухса кай 'go exiting > leave'.

Numerals
The number system is decimal. The numbers from one to ten are:
 1 –  pĕrre (пĕрре), pĕr (пĕр)
 2 –  ikkĕ (иккĕ), ikĕ (икĕ), ik (ик)
 3 –  wişşĕ (виççĕ), wişĕ (виçĕ), wiş (виç)
 4 –  tăwattă (тӑваттӑ)  tvată (тватӑ),  tăwat (тӑват), tvat (тват)
 5 –  pillĕk (пиллӗк), pilĕk (пиллĕк), pil (пил)
 6 –  ulttă (улттӑ), ultă (ултă), ult (улт), /
 7 –  şiççĕ (çиччĕ), şiçĕ (çичĕ), şiç (сич), 
 8 –  sakkăr (саккăр), sakăr (сакăр), 
 9 –  tăhhăr (тăххăр), tăhăr (тăхăр)
 10 – wunnă (вуннă), wun (вун)

The teens are formed by juxtaposing the word 'ten' and the corresponding single digit:
 11 – wun pĕr (вун пĕр)
 12 – wun ikkĕ (вун иккĕ), wun ikĕ (вун икĕ), wun ik (вун ик)
 13 – wun vişşĕ (вун виççĕ), wun vişĕ (вун виçĕ), wun viş (вун виç)
 14 – wun tăwattă (вун тăваттă), wun tvată (вун тватă), wun tvat (вун тват)
 15 – wun pillĕk (вун пиллĕк), wun pilĕk (вун пилĕк), wun pil (вун пил)
 16 – wun ulttă (вун улттă), wun ultă (вун ултă), wun ult (вун улт)
 17 – wun şiççĕ (вун çиччĕ), wun şiçĕ (вун çичĕ), wun şiç (вун çич)
 18 – wun sakkăr (вун саккăр), wun sakăr (вун сакăр)
 19 – wun tăhhăr (вун тăххăр), wun tăhăr (вун тăхăр)

The tens are formed in somewhat different ways: from 20 to 50, they exhibit suppletion; 60 and 70 have a suffix -мӑл together with stem changes; while 80 and 90 juxtapose the corresponding single digit and the word 'ten'.
 20 – şirĕm (çирĕм)
 30 – wătăr (вăтăр)
 40 – hĕrĕh (хĕрĕх)
 50 – allă (аллă), ală (алă), al (ал)
 60 – utmăl (утмăл)
 70 – şitmĕl (çитмĕл)
 80 – sakăr wunnă (сакăр вуннă), sakăr wun (сакăр вун)
 90 – tăhăr wunnă (тăхăр вуннă), tăhăr wun (тăхăр вун)

Further multiples of ten are:
 100 – şĕr (çĕр)
 1000 – pin (пин)

 Example: 834236 - sakăr şĕr wătăr tvată pin te ik şĕr wătăr ulttă (сакӑр ҫӗр вӑтӑр тӑватӑ пин те ик ҫӗр вӑтӑр улттӑ), 

Ordinal numerals are formed with the suffix -mĕš (-мӗш), e.g. pĕrremĕš (пӗррӗмӗш) 'first', ikkĕmĕš (иккӗмӗш) 'second'. There are also alternate ordinal numerals formed with the suffix -ӑм/-ĕм, which are used only for days, nights and years and only for the numbers from three to seven, e.g. wişĕm (виҫӗм) 'third', tvatăm (тватăм), pilĕm (пилĕм), ultăm (ултăм), şiçĕm (çичĕм), wunăm (вунăм).

Word formation
Some notable suffixes are: -ҫӑ for agent nouns,  -лӑх for abstract and instrumental nouns, -ӑш, less commonly, for abstract nouns from certain adjectives, -у (after consonants) or -v (after vowels) for action nouns, -ла, -ал, -ар, and -н for denominal verbs. The valency changing suffixes and the gerunds were mentioned in the verbal morphology section above. Diminutives may be formed with multiple suffixes such as -ашка, -(к)ка, -лчӑ, -ак/ӑк, -ача.

Sample text
1. Хĕвелĕн икĕ арăм: Ирхи Шуçăмпа Каçхи Шуçăм.
1. The Sun has two wives: Dawn and Afterglow (lit. "the Morning Glow" and "the Evening Glow").
2. Ир пулсан Хĕвел Ирхи Шуçăмран уйрăлса каять
2. When it is morning, the Sun leaves Dawn
3. те яра кун тăршшĕпе Каçхи Шуçăм патнелле сулăнать.
3. and during the whole day (he) moves towards Afterglow.
4. Çак икĕ мăшăрĕнчен унăн ачасем:
4. From these two spouses of his, he has children:
5. Этем ятлă ывăл тата Сывлăм ятлă хĕр пур.
5. a son named Etem (Human) and a daughter named Syvlăm (Dew).
6. Этемпе Сывлăм пĕррехинче Çĕр чăмăрĕ çинче тĕл пулнă та,
6. Etem and Syvlăm once met on the globe of the Earth,
7. пĕр-пĕрне юратса çемье чăмăртанă.
7. fell in love with each other and started a family.
8. Халь пурăнакан этемсем çав мăшăрăн тăхăмĕсем.
8. The humans who live today are the descendants of this couple.

See also
 Chuvash literature
 Bulgar language
 Cyrillic script
 Oghur languages
 Turkic Avar language
 Turkic languages
 Ivan Yakovlev

Notes

References
Specific

General

 Agyagási, Klára. Chuvash Historical Phonetics: An Areal Linguistic Study. With an Appendix on the Role of Proto-Mari in the History of Chuvash Vocalism. 1st ed. Harrassowitz Verlag, 2019. https://doi.org/10.2307/j.ctvh4zh9k.
 
 Dobrovolsky, Michael (1999). "The phonetics of Chuvash stress: implications for phonology". Proceedings of the XIV International Congress of Phonetic Sciences, 539–542. Berkeley: University of California.
 Johanson, Lars & Éva Agnes Csató, ed. (1998). The Turkic languages. London: Routledge.
 
 
 
 Johanson, Lars (2007). Chuvash. Encyclopedia of Language and Linguistics. Oxford: Elsevier.
 
 
 Павлов, И. П. (2017). Современный чувашский язык. Чебоксары.
 
 Róna-Tas, András (2007). "Nutshell Chuvash" (PDF). Erasmus Mundus Intensive Program Turkic languages and cultures in Europe (TLCE). Archived from the original (PDF) on 7 August 2011.*

External links

Resources

 Chuvash–Russian On-Line Dictionary
 Chuvash English On-Line Dictionary
 Chuvash People's Website , also available in Chuvash, Esperanto and Russian (contains Chuvash literature)
 Nutshell Chuvash, by András Róna-Tas 
 Chuvash people and language by Éva Kincses Nagy, Istanbul Erasmus IP 1- 13. 2. 2007
 Chuvash manual online
 The Chuvash-Russian bilingual corpus
 Translations of works by Alexander Pushkin into Chuvash
 Chuvash literature blog

News and opinion articles
 Скоро чувашский язык останется "какой-то культурной традицией"
 Виталий Станьял: На чувашском конь еще не валялся...
 Виталий Станьял: Решение Совета Аксакалов ЧНК
 Прощай, исчезающий чувашский язык?
 Чӑваш чӗлхине Страсбургра хӳтӗлӗҫ
 Тутарстанра чӗлхе пирки сӑмахларӗҫ
 Владимир Болгарский. Об угрозе развала страны в будущем, о съезде ЧНК, и об обращении к президенту
 Why don't Chuvash people speak Chuvash?
 "As it is in the Chuvash Republic the Chuvash are not needed?!"

 
Agglutinative languages
Chuvash people
Languages of Russia
Vowel-harmony languages
Oghur languages
Turkic languages